Derek Colclough Walker-Smith, Baron Broxbourne,  (13 April 1910 – 22 January 1992), known as Sir Derek Walker-Smith, Bt, from 1960 to 1983, was a British Conservative Party politician.

The son of Sir Jonah Walker-Smith (1874–1964) and his wife Maud, daughter of Coulton Walker Hunter, Walker-Smith was educated at Rossall School and Christ Church, Oxford. He became a barrister, called to the bar by Middle Temple in 1934. He joined the British Army and after the outbreak of World War II he attended the Staff College, Camberley, where Brian Horrocks was among his instructors. He was vice-chairman of the Inns of Court Conservative and Unionist Society and was made Queen's Counsel in 1955.

Walker-Smith was the Member of Parliament (MP) for Hertford from 1945 to 1955, and East Hertfordshire from 1955 to 1983. He was Chairman of the 1922 Committee 1951–55. He held ministerial positions, including Economic Secretary to the Treasury (1956–57), at the Board of Trade (1955–56 and 1957), and Health (1957–59).

Walker-Smith was created a baronet, of Broxbourne in the County of Hertford, in 1960. On 21 September 1983, he was elevated to a life peerage as Baron Broxbourne, of Broxbourne in the County of Hertfordshire. The life barony became extinct on his death aged 81 in 1992 while he was succeeded in the hereditary baronetcy by his son Jonah.

Bibliography

References

Sources
Times Guide to the House of Commons, 1979

Broxbourne, Derek Walker-Smith, Baron
Broxbourne, Derek Walker-Smith, Baron
20th-century British lawyers
Alumni of Christ Church, Oxford
Baronets in the Baronetage of the United Kingdom
English King's Counsel
Chairmen of the 1922 Committee
Conservative Party (UK) MEPs
Conservative Party (UK) MPs for English constituencies
Broxbourne, Derek Walker-Smith, Baron
MEPs for the United Kingdom 1973–1979
Members of the Privy Council of the United Kingdom
Ministers in the Eden government, 1955–1957
Ministers in the Macmillan and Douglas-Home governments, 1957–1964
Ministers in the third Churchill government, 1951–1955
Parliamentary Secretaries to the Board of Trade
People educated at Rossall School
UK MPs 1945–1950
UK MPs 1950–1951
UK MPs 1951–1955
UK MPs 1955–1959
UK MPs 1959–1964
UK MPs 1964–1966
UK MPs 1966–1970
UK MPs 1970–1974
UK MPs 1974
UK MPs 1974–1979
UK MPs 1979–1983
British Army personnel of World War II
Graduates of the Staff College, Camberley
British Army officers
Life peers created by Elizabeth II